Kim Brown Seely (born Kimberly Allyson Brown; 1961) is an American author, writer of travel and adventure, and a 2016 Lowell Thomas Travel 'Journalist of the Year.' She is the author of the memoir Uncharted: A Couple’s Epic Empty-Nest Adventure Sailing from One Life to Another.  Her book was given the Silver Award in the 2019 Nautilus Book Awards.  She has published articles in magazines including Travel + Leisure, Town & Country, National Geographic Traveler, Virtuoso Travel & Life, Sunset, Coastal Living and Outside.  She lives in Seattle, Washington.

Personal life

Seely was born and grew up in southern California.  After graduating from Stanford University she moved to New York City and began her career as a journalist.  She joined Travel & Leisure magazine where she became Senior Editor.  She subsequently became Senior Editor of Mungo Park, the first online adventure travel magazine published by Microsoft, and later served as the travel books editor at Amazon.com.  She was a contributing editor at National Geographic Adventure magazine. Seely is a member of the board of directors of Copper Canyon Press, an independent, non-profit publisher of poetry based in Port Townsend, Washington and winner of the 2019 National Book Award for Poetry. She also served on the board and was Board President for Seattle Arts & Lectures. Kim is married to Jeffrey T. Seely.
They have two sons.

Memoir

Uncharted: A Couple’s Epic Empty-Nest Adventure Sailing from One Life to Another, Sasquatch/Penguin Random House, 2019

References

External links
 
 She’s Bold Podcast #104
 11th Annual Goodreads Choice Awards
 Wall Street Journal- The Best Books About Retirement and Aging of 2019
 Portland Book Festival, 2019
 About the Author, Elliott Bay Books, 2019
 Review Uncharted, by Kim Brown Seely Publishers Weekly
 Review Uncharted, by Kim Brown Seely Outside Magazine

1961 births
Living people
Stanford University alumni
21st-century American women writers
21st-century American memoirists
American travel writers
American women travel writers
Writers from Seattle
Writers from California
American women memoirists